The North Tallapoosa Residential Historic District, in Tallapoosa, Georgia, is a  historic district roughly centered on int. Bowden St. and Manning St.  The listing included 157 contributing buildings and a contributing site.  It also included 71 non-contributing buildings and a non-contributing site.

Included in the district are:
Tallapoosa Presbyterian Church (c.1891) a Gothic Revival-style church with a corner entrance tower, moved in 1905
Methodist Episcopal Church (later Pentecostal Holiness Church) (c. 1895–1903), similar, moved in 1915
Methodist Episcopal Church South (later United Methodist Church) (c. 1918–19), brick Classical Revival
First Baptist Church (1952), brick Colonial Revival-style
Tallapoosa High School (1936), later the Tallapoosa Elementary School.

Engineer Charles D. Camp was responsible for the town's 1882 plan.

References

Historic districts on the National Register of Historic Places in Georgia (U.S. state)
National Register of Historic Places in Haralson County, Georgia
Colonial architecture in the United States
Georgian architecture in Georgia (U.S. state)
Buildings and structures completed in 1882